Ethan Francis Cutkosky (born August 19, 1999) is an American actor and singer, best known for his roles as Carl Gallagher on the Showtime series Shameless,
and Barto in The Unborn.

Early life 
Ethan Francis Cutkosky was born on August 19, 1999, in Campton Hills, Illinois, the only child of Yvonne Cabrera Cutkosky, a teacher, and David Cutkosky, a computer software engineer. Cutkosky's mother is of Mexican descent. Cutkosky attended Bell Graham Elementary School, located in Campton Hills, Illinois and Thompson Middle School, located in St. Charles, Illinois. He attended St. Charles East High School in St. Charles, Illinois.

Acting career 
Cutkosky began doing photo ads when he was four years old as a way for his mother and him to spend time together. After a few ads he was asked to audition for commercials and then movies. He landed his first film role playing Carl with Vince Vaughn in the Christmas comedy Fred Claus (2007) when he was seven years old. At the age of nine Cutkosky played a mythical spirit named Barto in the supernatural horror film The Unborn (2009), where he had the opportunity to play opposite Gary Oldman.

In 2009 Cutkosky was selected to play Carl Gallagher in the Showtime television series Shameless, the second youngest Gallagher sibling and biggest troublemaker. Shameless ran for 11 seasons until 2021, and is currently the longest running original scripted series in Showtime's history.

Music and model career 
Cutkosky continues to expand his voice as an artist, creating his own fashion brand Khaotic Collective in 2018 and producing music. Cutkosky released a single, "Erase Me", on July 16, 2021.

Personal life 
On November 6, 2017, Cutkosky was arrested for driving under the influence in Los Angeles. He accepted a plea deal and charges were dismissed.

Filmography

Film

Television

Discography

References 
 he’s hot

External links 
 

1999 births
Living people
21st-century American male actors
American child models
American male child actors
People from St. Charles, Illinois
American male film actors
American male television actors
American male actors of Mexican descent